Pirate Latitudes is an action adventure novel by Michael Crichton, the sixteenth novel to be published under his own name and first to be published after his death, concerning 17th-century piracy in the Caribbean. HarperCollins  published the book posthumously on November 26, 2009. The story stars the fictional privateer Captain Charles Hunter who, hired by Jamaica's governor Sir James Almont, plots to raid a Spanish galleon for its treasure.

Background
Crichton's assistant discovered the manuscript on one of Crichton's computers after his death in 2008, along with an unfinished novel, Micro (2011).

According to Marla Warren, there is evidence that Crichton had been working on Pirate Latitudes at least since the 1970s; to substantiate her position, she quotes a statement by Patrick McGilligan in the March 1979 issue of American Film that Crichton was aiming "to complete a long-standing book project about Caribbean pirates in the seventeenth century.". In 1981, Crichton said he was working on a pirate story, and he mentioned a research trip to Jamaica in 1982 in his non-fiction book Travels (1988).

According to Jonathan Burnham, a publisher of a HarperCollins imprint, Pirate Latitudes had been written concurrently with Crichton's then most recent novel, Next (2006).

Historical basis
Alan Cheuse said, in review for NPR Books: "It builds on an actual event in maritime records" when pirates out of the Caribbean port of Port Royal attacked a fortress on a Spanish island in order to plunder – I like that word, and it's what pirates do, they plunder – a ship filled with new world treasure."

Though reviewers have compared Crichton's novel to Disney's Pirates of the Caribbean, the Historical Novel Society notes: "Crichton's portrayal of Port Royal and its inhabitants is far more grounded in reality than Disney's portrayal.

Plot
In 1665, Captain Charles Hunter is hired as a privateer by the Governor of Jamaica, Sir James Almont, to lead an expedition to the island fortress of Matanceros. Almont is excited about the possibility of reward in this venture, though his secretary, Mr. Robert Hacklett, is less than enthusiastic and calls Hunter a pirate.

They travel out to Matanceros. Mere days into the journey, they come across trouble and get locked up. Hunter and his crew reboard their ship after breaking free and continue on their way before they get caught again.

Upon their arrival at Matanceros, Hunter, Black Eye, Lazue, Sanson, and the Moor all make their way behind the fortress. Encountering high cliffs, rough jungle foliage, and deadly animals, the crew comes to see that Cazalla has docked under the suspicion that Hunter is still on his way to the island.  The privateers manage to make their way around the village and the soldiers occupying it long enough to set their traps. After a short duel between Hunter and Cazalla, the traps are sprung, and a cut to the throat kills Cazalla. The Cassandra appears, and the crew takes their captain, his shipmates, and the galleon out to sea.

After a few days, the treasure inside the galleon, El Trinidad, is accounted for, but Hunter refuses to split the treasure between the two ships, not trusting Sanson. Soon afterward, Hunter discovers he is being pursued by the warship commanded by Bosquet, Cazalla's second-in-command. Hunter is chased to Monkey Bay, where he narrowly evades capture with the aid of Lazue's keen eyesight. The sun's glare on the ocean renders the warship unable to follow. Here, Hunter waits a few days, until the crew spy an impending hurricane. Now they divide the treasure between the two ships, in case one sinks in the storm and all is lost. Using Don Diego's genius, they arm their cannons and aim for a mere two defensive shots. Upon their departure, however, the warship has disappeared.

While celebrating their surprise escape, they see – a few miles out to sea – the warship quickly approaching their stern. With Hunter aboard, El Trinidad sustains massive damage from cannon fire. The aimed cannons fire upon the warship, merely damaging it with the first shot and seeming to miss entirely with the second. However, after a moment of inactivity, Hunter realizes the second shot actually landed a devastating blow, and the attacking ship explodes and sinks rapidly. Moments later, there is little evidence of the warship.

Victory evades the two ships, however, as rain and storm begin. The El Trinidad and the Cassandra, helmed by Sanson, are separated by fierce winds and strong currents. After the storm abates, Hunter finds El Trinidad beached on a strange island. A few hours later, they see the island is inhabited by cannibal natives, who nearly capture Governor Almont's niece. On their way back to Port Royal, the crew suffers yet another misfortune when a Kraken (see "lusca") attacks their ship. After the beast has killed many and damaged the vessel, Hunter manages to mortally injure it.  Their path to Port Royal is finally clear.

Upon the crew's arrival, a courier informs them that Almont is gravely sick, and Hacklett has taken charge as governor. Hunter is arrested and put to trial, at which Sanson betrays his captain and lies to the court. Hunter is sentenced to be placed in prison and then hanged. With the aid of Almont (who was being held prisoner by Hacklett), Hunter is sprung from prison and kills the men who sentenced him, save for the judge, who pardons Hunter. Hacklett is shot in the groin by his wife (whom he has caused to be raped by an associate), and Sanson sends word that he alone knows where the other half of the treasure is. Hunter turns the man's own crossbow against him, killing Sanson, and throws his body overboard letting the sharks eat his body, and is never able to find Sanson's treasure.

Characters
Captain Charles Hunter — Hunter is a privateer who leads the Cassandra on their journey for treasure. Born in 1627, Hunter is originally from the Massachusetts Bay Colony and has a Harvard education. A cunning and resourceful man, he is in many ways reminiscent of the criminal mastermind Edward Pierce from Crichton's earlier bestseller The Great Train Robbery (1975). Hunter abandoned his home and religion at an early age. Although generally a reasonable man of his word, Hunter does not hesitate to use violence and threats to reach his goals—wealth. Additionally, it is mentioned that Cazalla murdered one of Hunter's brothers years before, allegedly by being strung up and castrated, and choking on his testicles stuffed in his mouth. In the end, Hunter catches malaria during his long voyages to find Sanson's treasure and dies almost completely forgotten, in England in 1670, with a modest estate. His son with Mrs. Hacklett becomes a merchant in the New World, and his grandson is ultimately appointed governor of the Carolina Colony during the early American Revolutionary War.
Don Diego a.k.a. Black Eye a.k.a. the Jew — Don Diego runs a jewelry shop in Port Royal. He is a very intelligent man, able to create and invent many instruments to suit his own needs or his mates'. In his past, he also worked with gunpowder and armaments, costing himself three fingers and permanently blackening his eye (hence the name Black Eye). Diego is a Jewish man who lost a son to the Inquisition. In the story's epilogue, Diego lives to a very old age and finally dies during the earthquake that flattened Port Royal.
Sanson — A very large and heavyset man, Andre Sanson is a visual interpretation of the word assassin, with the exception of his surprisingly high voice. Notorious for being the most ruthless killer in the Caribbean, this Frenchman's skills include use of the sword, pistol, and crossbow, and negotiations. He is, however, distrusted by many Englishmen due to his nationality; this distrust is later vindicated by his treacherous actions in the book's conclusion.
Lazue — Lazue, an excellent marksman possessed of extraordinary vision, can see far more accurately than anyone else. Raised as a man, this woman is able to confuse her enemies by baring her breasts to gain advantage. Her ability to traverse through shallow waters and coral reefs make her an important asset to the Cassandra. The tale's epilogue mentions that Lazue is eventually hanged in Charleston, Carolina around 1704, as a pirate and alleged lover of Blackbeard's.
Enders — While in Port Royal, Mr. Enders operates as a barber-surgeon. While at sea, he is a helmsman, able to read and steer the Cassandra perfectly due to his innate ability, and is often referred to as a "sea artist". His relationship with the ship makes his experience needed many times during the voyage. Evidently, his luck eventually runs out, as it is stated he died during a storm on another expedition soon after the book's conclusion.
Bassa a.k.a. The Moor — A huge dark man, this giant is mute. After he killed the man who cut off his tongue and murdered his wife, the Moor escaped to Port Royal to make a living.  Communicating with gestures, he embodies intimidation, strength, and power. The book's epilogue states he was killed by a released bull during Henry Morgan's daring attack on Panama in 1669, of which he was likely an expedition member.
Sir James Almont — Governor of Jamaica, Almont resides in Port Royal. Known locally as "James the Tenth", it is Almont who commissions Captain Hunter for the Matanceros expedition. Both Almont and his niece return to England shortly after the events of the story, only to perish in the Great Fire of London, in 1666.
Robert Hacklett — A young and loyal man of England, Mr. Hacklett begins as a secretary hired to assist Governor Almont. Hacklett is a man of many words who throws them around without regard for consequence. In his eyes, all of Charles Hunter's privateering expeditions appear to be piratical ventures. Hacklett also has the misfortunes of being impotent (or at least sterile) and of having married a promiscuous, pretty wife who is well known to have been a mistress of King Charles II. Early on, Mrs. Emily Hacklett becomes pregnant after a brief fling with Captain Hunter, and in anger Robert later allows Commander Scott to rape her. The same night, she fatally shoots Hacklett in the groin before Hunter arrives to take revenge. Mrs. Hacklett dies of syphilis in 1686. Her illegitimate son with Hunter becomes a merchant, and her grandson ultimately is appointed governor of the Carolina Colony during the American Revolutionary War.
Captain Cazalla — Cazalla, a brutal villain in many respects, is a Spaniard who commands the Spanish fortress of Matanceros and commands a warship that guards the naos in Matanceros' harbor. He has a violent history with both Don Diego and Captain Hunter, yet has never met either.
Anne Sharpe — Anne is a beautiful girl who was sent to Port Royal. Despite her youth and innocent looks, she is not afraid. She helps free Hunter from prison and aids him in his revenge against Sanson.

Film adaptation
In August 2009, Steven Spielberg (an admirer of Crichton's work) announced his intention to adapt the novel to film, reportedly having wanted to make a pirate film. Spielberg hired David Koepp to pen the screenplay. Anil Ambani's Reliance Big Entertainment and Spielberg's DreamWorks Studios will produce the film, which will be the third of Crichton's novels Spielberg has adapted, after the highly successful Jurassic Park films. As of 2011, no new news about a potential film has been released.

References

Further reading 
 

2009 American novels
Novels by Michael Crichton
Novels about pirates
Novels published posthumously
Novels set in Jamaica
Fiction set in 1665
HarperCollins books
Kraken in popular culture